Ezell may refer to:

People

Surname
Edward Ezell (1939–1993), American author and professor
Glenn Ezell (born 1944), American baseball player, coach and front-office executive
Shahine Ezell, American actor
William Ezell (1892–1963), American musical artist

Given name
Ezell Blair, Jr., American activist
Ezell Brown (born 1970), American businessman
Ezell Lee, American politician

Other uses
Ezell, South Carolina, a ghost town
Ezell, Virginia
Ezell Park, an urban park in Nashville, Tennessee
Ezell's Chicken, a fast food restaurant in Seattle, Washington

See also
 Ezel (disambiguation)